Hugo Savinovich (born February 15, 1959) is an Ecuadorian sports commentator and retired professional wrestler and professional wrestling manager. He is currently signed to Lucha Libre AAA as a Spanish commentator. He is best known as part of the Spanish language commentary team for the professional wrestling promotion WWE from 1994 to 2011.

Early life 
Savinovich moved from Ecuador with his family to the Bronx, New York. Has wrestled for many years, performing in many Caribbean countries like Puerto Rico, Panama, and the Dominican Republic. He claims that becoming a professional wrestler literally saved his life, as he was originally a gang member in the streets of New York in the late 1960s and early 1970s. He joined the sport under the guidance of Angel "El Toro" Maldonado. Mexican wrestling promoter Arturo Mendoza took him to Puerto Rico to work in his Wrestling company based in the west part of the island.

Professional wrestling career 
Savinovich began his wrestling career in working for promoter Angel "El Toro" Maldonado in New York as the masked La Pantera Asesina. Later worked for Arturo Mendoza who ran wrestling shows in the west area of Puerto Rico. Moved on to the World Wrestling Council in 1978. He was originally a "tecnico" (the Spanish wrestling term for a "face", or "good guy"); after breaking up with Mendoza and his original wrestling partner, Little Chief Cherokee, he joined the local World Wrestling Council franchise in Puerto Rico, Capitol Sport Promotions (owned partially by Carlos Colón), where he gained notoriety for being one of the "rudo" wrestlers (i.e., "heels", or wrestling villains), with a penchant for flamboyancy and self-promotion that gained him his most famous ring name, "El Muñecazo" ("The Big Baby Doll"). Savinovich is on record as stating that he modeled his role after Gorgeous George, although his looks were particular to him and him alone (long hair with a mullet and David Letterman-like gaped teeth). He did promote his wrestlers using a high-pitched voice and fast narrative style, inspired in soccer transmitions, and which he pioneered in Puerto Rico, since then called "estilo lucha libre" ("wrestling style"), but a style that he copied from legendary Mexican sports announcer Gilberto Alberto Morales Villela, better known as Dr. Alfonso Morales, who was a prominent boxing and lucha libre Play-By-Play announcer and commentator.

He would tour the United States for Western States Sports and Mid-South Wrestling in 1980 and Japan for All Japan Pro Wrestling in 1984.

Hugo managed some the most notorious heels in professional wrestling such as Abdullah the Butcher, Ox Baker, The Sheik and Buddy Landell until he had a fallout with Barrabas Sr becoming a face in 1984.

Savinovich eventually became a partner at World Wrestling Council, only to split with Colón a few years after in a rather acrimonious business disputes with the company management forced him to leave and joined the rival American Wrestling Federation.

In 1991, Savinovich would come out of retirement after seven years and feud with Billy Joe Travis, which would last a couple years in WWC and AWF.

During his wrestler run, he wrestled names like Bret Hart, Eric Embry and his biggest rival, El Profe. 

His last high profiled match was when he teamed with Kane to defeat Chicky Starr and Victor The Bodyguard on April, 7 2001 for IWA Puerto Rico.

Sports Commentary and Reporter 
While working for Arturo Mendoza, Mendo noticed that Savinovich had the skills needed for a wrestling announcer. Savinovich later became an announcer in the World Wrestling Council, when he replaced Rickin Sánchez who left the promotion in the fall of 1984. He remained there until November 1991, when he joined the American Wrestling Federation who ran in opposition to the World Wrestling Council.

In 1994, Savinovich accepted an offer from the World Wrestling Federation to work as a Spanish announcer. He was paired with Carlos Cabrera to host the Spanish language versions of Raw, SmackDown, Superstars, NXT, and pay-per-view (PPV) events. 
Savinovich and Cabrera provided live Spanish commentary for all weekly shows from the WWE Television Studios in Stamford, Connecticut and sat ringside for PPV events. This practice temporarily ended in mid-2006. Originally due to the addition of the now-defunct ECW brand, the announce teams of all three brands were present for tri-branded pay-per-views (Royal Rumble, WrestleMania, SummerSlam, and Survivor Series). During this time, Savinovich and Cabrera provided commentary for these events from the WWE Television Studios, but were still placed at ringside for brand-exclusive PPV events. When the brand-exclusive pay-per-view concept ended in 2007, the announce teams of all three brands were placed at ringside for all PPV events. Beginning in 2009, a single three-man announce team, composed of announcers from the two current brands, was designated for pay-per-views. Savinovich and Cabrera returned to ringside for PPVs at The 25th Anniversary of WrestleMania in 2009. However, they were not reinstated full-time until WrestleMania XXVI in 2010.

The Spanish announcers' table has become a staple in professional wrestling. It is a convenient device for wrestlers to execute dramatic moves on, such as the Piledriver or the Pedigree. The moves almost always result in the destruction of the table. One of the most famous on-air incidents that Savinovich was involved in with WWE was at WrestleMania XIX, when he accidentally received a chair shot to the head from Hulk Hogan in the match between Hogan and Vince McMahon after McMahon ducked a chair shot. He was unable to continue with the broadcast and Cabrera had to finish the show by himself. 

Savinovich and Cabrera had a show at WWE.com called WWE En Español (WWE in Spanish), each episode of whice lasted about 30 minutes; it was a recap of Raw, SmackDown, NXT, and pay-per-view events. The show celebrated its 100th episode in April 2006. WWE later launched a mini-show starring Hugo and Carlos called 28 Segundos, which consists of the announcers making fun of life. The show is in Spanish and can be found on WWE.com.

In 2009 Savinovich returned to the World Wrestling Council after a 17-year absence, and the 2009 WWC Anniversary Card was dedicated to him. 

Savinovich was fired from WWE on October 5, 2011, although he only announced his dismissal on October 19 of that year. The details of his firing are not entirely clear, but different versions indicate that he did not leave on good terms with WWE, given that WWE did not say goodbye to the commentator on its official website. 

Savinovich was a guest commentator at the AAA Triplemania XXI. Also at that event, he was in El Mesias' corner in a match against Blue Demon Jr. for the AAA Latin American Championship. During the inaugural season of Lucha Underground in 2014, there were two versions of the commentary shot, an English version with Matt Striker and Vampiro, and a Spanish version that was broadcast on Unimas, with Savinovich doing the play-by-play. Vampiro did the color commentary for the Spanish version also. In recent years Hugo Savinovich has been announcing for AAA in Mexico and promoting pro wrestling in Florida and throughout South America and Puerto Rico.

In early January 2019, it was reported that Savinovich had signed with All Elite Wrestling as a Spanish commentator. He worked the events Double or Nothing and All Out along with Alex Abrahantes and Dasha Gonzalez. On March 16, 2019, at the Rey de Reyes event during a segment, Cody Rhodes appointed Savinovich as a commentator for All Elite Wrestling (recently allied with AAA) sometime that he accepted. Savinovich participated in two PPVs in Spanish for AEW, however, due to contractual problems with AAA and other internal issues with AEW, he was not hired again. 

Hugo Savinovich currently works for Lucha Libre Triple A in Mexico as a Spanish Commentator. Hugo also works as head of creative staff for AAA along with Konnan and AAA’s owner, Dorian Roldán. He also works for GWE in Panamá as a commentator and executive producer. Hugo was hired by wrestling promoter Darko Navarro to be the face of the pro wrestling company Wrestling Superstar along with Navarro in Chile. Savinovich also works for WAR in Ecuador, and for NGCW in Florida as a Producer, Commentator and Main Booker. He also worked for Imperio Lucha Libre in Perú. 

Hugo is currently a pro wrestling reporter in the spanish speaking community. He is part of Lucha Libre Online, along with Javier González and Michael Morales Torres. His work of reporting has been quoted by sources like Forbes, New York Post, among others, but not for his good work. He works live reports after WWE, AEW, Impact Wrestling and AAA’s events on their Facebook Page. Hugo acts as an analyst of the latest wrestling events, while giving his point of view.

Controversies

Savinovich reported in November 2019 that WWE wrestlers were kidnapped in Saudi Arabia. In July 2020, he was involved in a controversy because through Superluchas.com, Jerry McDevitt, WWE's main lawyer, denied his version that the WWE Superstars had been kidnapped in Saudi Arabia in November 2019.

In August 2020, Savinovich wanted to promote an interview with wrestler Karrion Kross, with whom he was good friends since they both worked at Lucha Libre AAA. However, Savinovich revealed in a live broadcast that Kross had allegedly been a hit man for the mafia in his youth. This caused quite a stir in the world of wrestling. However, hours later Savinovich had to apologize to the fans and Kross for his words and tried to hide behind a false translation error of his words into English. This error never existed, as proven by the video of the live broadcast. SUPER LUCHAS debunked that Kross had been a real murderer in his youth and revealed that Savinovich only wanted, through clickbait and exaggerating the Kayfabe, to generate money for his YouTube channel Lucha Libre Online. Savinovich revealed that Kross called him quite angry to ask for an explanation for his words. And while Savinovich said the two were still friends, the reality is that the relationship between them broke down and Kross never gave Savinovich the announced interview.

Critics

Lucha Libre Online, the project that Savinovich works on, has been criticized for its tabloid style of journalism and its tendency to clickbait. Savinovich himself has been criticized for allegedly taking a victim position when criticized, claiming that he cannot do anything wrong by being a religious pastor.

During 2020 he started many auctions, stating that they are meant to help needy communities. However, this has been questioned since less money has been sent to the beneficiaries and also due to the delivery of that money to other evangelical pastors led by Savinovich.

Savinovich has been criticized by media such as Super Luchas, to which the latter he has denied claiming that he is not as important a medium as the one he runs.

Personal life
Savinovich was once married to former female wrestler Wendi Richter until the couple divorced. In 1990 he married Diana Mendéz and has two sons: Jovannie and Genaro. Diana Mendéz died on November 1, 2019, after a long battle with cancer.

On March 22, 1997, Savinovich suffered a severe episode of depression due to drug use and various personal problems that almost led him to commit suicide in a hotel in Rosemont, Illinois, just one day before WrestleMania 13. In April of that year he was arrested in a raid on his apartment in New York City. He returned to WWE in 1998, after being sentenced to eight years in jail for which he paid on probation. 

He is a born-again Christian and travels most of South and Central America sharing his Christian testimony. Hugo is the author of his own autobiography book, Atángana Ring de Tentaciones. He has announced that will be publishing a second book in 2024.

Championships and accomplishments
Western States Sports
NWA Western States Tag Team Championship (1 time) - with Mitsu Ishikawa
L&G Promotions
L&G Caribbean Heavyweight Championship (4 times) 
Dominican Wrestling Federation
DWF World Tag Team Championship (4 times) - with Relámpago Hernández

Luchas de Apuestas record

References

External links 
 
 

1959 births
Converts to Christianity
Ecuadorian male professional wrestlers
Ecuadorian emigrants to the United States
Ecuadorian people of Croatian descent
Living people
Sportspeople from Guayaquil
Professional wrestling announcers
Professional wrestling promoters
Professional wrestling managers and valets
All Elite Wrestling personnel